Shenzhen Metro MOVIA EMU is the first electric multiple unit of Shenzhen Metro. It runs on Shenzhen Metro Line 1. 132 cars were ordered, built by Bombardier Transportation and CRRC Changchun Railway Vehicles Co., Ltd.

Features 
The model is Movia 456. The Shenzhen Metro Group ordered it in November 2001 for Line 1. The 22 trains each consist of 6 cars. The first train was manufactured by Bombardier in Germany, and arrived in Shenzhen on April 23, 2004. The remaining 21 trains were manufactured in Changchun. Compared with the same type of train for Guangzhou Metro and Shanghai Metro, this train uses Faiveley plug doors to reduce noise.

References 

Electric multiple units of China
1500 V DC multiple units
Bombardier Transportation multiple units